Baron Broadbridge, of Brighton in the County of Sussex, is a title in the Peerage of the United Kingdom. It was created in 1945 for the Conservative politician Sir George Broadbridge, 1st Baronet. He had already been created a Baronet, of Wargrave Place in the County of Berkshire, on 22 November 1937. The title descended from father to son until the death of his grandson, the third Baron, in 2000. The late Baron was succeeded by his first cousin, who became the fourth holder of the titles. He was the son of Hugh Trevor Broadbridge, third son of the first Baron. He was in turn succeeded by his only son, Richard, a retired air vice-marshal who was honorary surgeon to the Queen, in 2020.

Baron Broadbridge (1945)
George Thomas Broadbridge, 1st Baron Broadbridge (1869–1952)
Eric Wilberforce Broadbridge, 2nd Baron Broadbridge (1895–1972)
Peter Hewett Broadbridge, 3rd Baron Broadbridge (1938–2000)
Martin Hugh Broadbridge, 4th Baron Broadbridge (1929–2020)
Richard John Martin Broadbridge, 5th Baron Broadbridge (born 1959)

The heir apparent and sole heir to the peerage is the present holder's son, Mark Andrew Broadbridge (born 1983)

Male-line family tree

Arms

References

Kidd, Charles, Williamson, David (editors). Debrett's Peerage and Baronetage (1990 edition). New York: St Martin's Press, 1990.

Baronies in the Peerage of the United Kingdom
Noble titles created in 1945
Noble titles created for UK MPs